Events in the year 1928 in Turkey.

Parliament
 3rd Parliament of Turkey

Incumbents
President – Kemal Atatürk
Prime Minister – İsmet İnönü

Ruling party and the main opposition
 Ruling party – Republican People's Party (CHP)

Cabinet
5th government of Turkey

Events
3 February – First hutbe in Turkish
 10 April –  State declared secular. ( see Secularism in Turkey) 
31 March – Earthquake around Torbalı (west Anatolia)
23 May – Turkish citizenship law
28 June – Nation schools a project to increase the literacy rate 
26 June – An academic committee to research on the adoptation of Latin alphabet to Turkish language
9 August – Kemal Atatürk announced that Turkish alphabet (a version of Latin alphabet, devoid of q, w and x and with the addition of ç, ş, ğ, ı, ö and ü)  will replace the traditional Arabic alphabet in Turkish language. This is considered as a major step in the modernization of Turkey)
3 November: Latin alphabet adopted.
1 December: Latin alphabet law takes effect. 
10 December – Surname law (up to 1928 people had no surnames and instead of surnames their place of birth was in use)

Births
6 January – İsmet Sezgin, politician (d. 2016)
28 February – Kuzgun Acar, sculptor (d. 1976)
5 April – Haldun Dormen, theatre actor
30 June – Orhan Boran, standup actor
16 August – Ara Güler, photographer
10 October – Leyla Gencer, operatic soprano (d. 2008)
11 October – Yıldız Kenter, theatre actress

Gallery

See also
Turkey at the 1928 Summer Olympics

References

 
Years of the 20th century in Turkey
Turkey
Turkey
Turkey